The Shimokotori Dam is a rock-fill dam on the Shimokotori River about  west of Hida in Gifu Prefecture, Japan. The power station discharges the water into the Jinzū River. Construction on the dam began in 1970 and it was completed in 1973. The power station went operational in May 1973 and is owned by Kansai Electric Power Company.

The dam was constructed by Aoki Corporation.

References

Dams in Gifu Prefecture
Hydroelectric power stations in Japan
Rock-filled dams
Dams completed in 1973
Energy infrastructure completed in 1973
Hida, Gifu